Richard Ryder (born 1966) is a Canadian comedian and broadcaster, best known as a host of programming on Toronto, Ontario radio station Proud FM and national cable television channel OutTV. He is the morning host on Proud FM, and his work for OutTV includes the reality series Knock Knock Ghost and weekly RuPaul's Drag Race commentaries recorded in character as drag queen Wilma Fingerdoo.

He regularly tours throughout Ontario as a performer at LGBT Pride and other LGBT-related comedy events.

References

Living people
Canadian drag queens
Canadian radio hosts
Canadian stand-up comedians
Canadian television hosts
Canadian LGBT broadcasters
Gay comedians
1966 births
Canadian LGBT comedians
21st-century Canadian LGBT people
Canadian gay men